Puni may refer to:

Places
 Puni, Afghanistan
 Kampong Puni, a village in Brunei
 Puni, New Zealand
 Honiana Te Puni (died 1870), Te Ati Awa leader, government adviser
 Ivan Puni (1894–1956), Russian avant-garde artist
 Linda Te Puni, diplomat from New Zealand

See also
 Puni Puni Poemy, an anime